This is a list of music genres and styles. Music can be described in terms of many genres and styles. Classifications are often arbitrary, and may be disputed and closely related forms often overlap. Larger genres and styles comprise more specific sub-categories.

Art (classical)

 Andalusian classical music
 Indian classical music
 Korean court music
 Persian classical music
 Western classical music
 Early music 
 Medieval music (500–1400) 
 Ars antiqua (1170–1310)
 Ars nova (1310–1377)
 Ars subtilior (1360–1420)
 Renaissance music (1400–1600)
Baroque music (1600–1750)
 Galant music (1720–1770)
Classical period (1750–1820)
Romantic music (1780–1910) 
 20th and 21st-centuries classical music (1901–present): 
 Modernism (1890–1930)
 Impressionism (1875 or 1890–1925)
Neoclassicism (1920–1950)
 High modernism (1930–present)
 Postmodern music (1930–present)
 Experimental music (1950–present)
Contemporary classical music (1945 or 1975–present)
Minimal music

Avant-garde and experimental

Crossover music
Danger music
Drone music
Electroacoustic
Instrumental
Lo-fi
Musical improvisation
Musique concrète
Noise
Outsider music
PC Music
Industrial music
Progressive music
Psychedelic music
Underground music

Popular

Blues

Country

Easy listening

Electronic

Contemporary folk

Hip hop

Jazz

Pop

R&B and soul

Rock

Metal

Punk

Regional

African

American 
North American

Eastern Europe

Asian

Middle Eastern

Arabic music
Arabic pop music
Fann at-Tanbura
Fijiri
Khaliji
Liwa
Sawt

Caribbean and Caribbean-influenced

Latin

Religious

 Buddhist music
 Christian music
 Church music
 Spirituals
 Gregorian chant
 Islamic music
 Hymn
 Liturgical music

Traditional folk

Latin folk
Fado
Huayno
Son mexicano
Música criolla

Other
Children's music
Dance music
Incidental music or music for stage and screen: music written for the score of a film, play, musicals, or other spheres, such as filmi, video game music, music hall songs and showtunes and others
Ballroom dance music: pasodoble, cha cha cha and others 
Patriotic music: military music, marches, national anthems and related compositions
Regional and national music with no significant commercial impact abroad, except when it is a version of an international genre, such as: traditional music, oral traditions, sea shanties, work songs, nursery rhymes, Arabesque and indigenous music. In North America and Western Europe, regional and national genres that are not from the Western world are sometimes classified as world music.
Yodeling

These categories are not exhaustive. A music platform, Gracenote, listed more than 2000 music genres (included by those created by ordinary music lovers, who are not involved within the music industry, these being said to be part of a 'folksonomy', i.e. a taxonomy created by non-experts). Most of these genres were created by music labels to target new audiences, however classification is useful to find music and distribute it.

See also

 Genealogy of musical genres

This list is split into four separate pages:
 List of styles of music: A–F                            
 List of styles of music: G–M                            
 List of styles of music: N–R                           
 List of styles of music: S–Z

References

Bibliography
Borthwick, Stuart, & Moy, Ron (2004) Popular Music Genres: An Introduction. Edinburgh: Edinburgh University Press.
Fabbri, Franco (1982) A Theory of Popular Music Genres: Two Applications. In Popular Music Perspectives, edited by David Horn and Philip Tagg, 52–81. Göteborg and Exeter: A. Wheaton & Co., Ltd.
Frith, Simon (1996) Performing Rites: On the Value of Popular Music. Cambridge, Massachusetts: Harvard University Press.
Holt, Fabian (2007) Genre in Popular Music. Chicago: University of Chicago Press.
Negus, Keith (1999) Music Genres and Corporate Cultures. London and New York: Routledge.

External links
 The genealogy and history of popular music genres
 Genres of popular music - Interactive relationships diagram